The women's team archery event was one of 4 archery events at the 2016 Summer Olympics.

Competition format
As with the other archery events, the women's team was a recurve archery event, held under the World Archery-approved 70-meter distance and rules. 12 teams of 3 archers each participated. Competition began with a ranking round, in which each archer shot 72 arrows (this was the same ranking round used for the individual event). The combined scores from the ranking round were used to seed the teams into a single-elimination bracket, with the top 4 teams receiving a bye into the second round (quarterfinals). Each match consisted four sets of 6 arrows, two per archer. The team with the highest score in the set – the total of the six arrows – receives two set points; if the teams are tied, each receives one set point. The first team to five set points wins the match.

Schedule
All times are Brasília Time (UTC−3).

Records
Prior to this competition, the existing world and Olympic records were as follows.

 216 arrow ranking round

Results
Source:

Ranking round

Competition bracket

References

Archery at the 2016 Summer Olympics
2016 in women's archery
Women's events at the 2016 Summer Olympics